Alberto Dell'Acqua (born 14 March 1938) is an Italian actor and stuntman. He appeared in more than forty films since 1955 mostly Italian Spaghetti Westerns, and was often credited as Robert Widmark, Cole Kitosh, Al Waterman and Albert Nova.

Selected filmography

References

External links 

Alberto Dell'Acqua @ fandango.com
Robert Widmark Biography @ sinematurk.com

1938 births
Living people
Italian male film actors
Male Spaghetti Western actors